Hediya Yousef is a Syrian-Kurdish politician who held the office of co-president of the Executive Council of Rojava from 17 March 2016 to 16 July 2018. Yousef is an ethnic Kurd, and served with fellow co-president Mansur Selum, an ethnic Arab.

Early life
 
In her twenties, Yousef, then a guerilla, had been imprisoned by the Assad government for two years in Damascus on charges of having been a member of a secret organization aiming to break up Syria.

Co-presidency of Jazeera Canton
Yousef first held the office of co-president of Jazeera Canton in the northeast of the newly established Rojava federation. Yousef served as co-president with fellow co-president Humeydi Daham al-Hadi, an Arab tribal leader. Yousef's office was located in the former headquarters of the state-owned Syrian Petroleum Company in the oil-rich city of Rmelan, the city where the Rojava federation had been declared.

"Co-governance" and Kurdish-Arab cooperation

During her tenure as co-president, Yousef worked towards greater inter-sectarian cooperation particularly between Kurds and Arabs. The Rojava federation, Yousef said, "is something beyond the nation-state. It's a place where all people, all minorities, and all genders are equally represented." Also during her tenure, Yousef pursued the policy of "co-governance" which, as she explained in an interview, ensures that "every position at every level of government in Rojava . . . includes a female equivalent of equal authority."

Co-presidency of the Rojava federation
In March 2016, Yousef was elected co-president of the Rojava federation. The federation covered about 16 percent of Syria's land area. In an interview upon her election, Yousef described the mission of the committee as creating "a wider and more comprehensive system" in the areas liberated from the Islamic State of Iraq and the Levant (ISIL) "that [gives] rights to all the groups to represent themselves and to form their own administrations."

Referring to the principle of co-governance's attempt to ensure that Syria is government so as to include the country's many ethnic groups (predominantly Arabs and Kurds), Abdulsalem Mohammed said that "Hediya [Yousef] represents Rojava and [Mansur] Selam represents northern Syria." Mohammed, a Kurdish teacher and activist from Qamishli, added that "This is based on the principle of our co-chair system and different nations, and equality between women and men."

"Democratic confederalism" and Kurdish separatism
In addition to supporting the policy of "co-governance," Yousef also supports the policy of "democratic confederalism" which honorary Group of Communities in Kurdistan leader Abdullah Ocalan wrote in 2005 was "not a State system [but] the democratic system of a people without a State." Yousef has spoken in support of Western intervention in the Syrian civil war but, in line with her democratic confederalist beliefs, opposes intervention for the purposes of establishing a Kurdish state separate from Syria. "We will not allow the fragmentation of Syria," she said in July 2016. "We want the democratization of Syria."

The Unification of Rojava
As the Syrian civil war unfolded and the Rojava federation emerged, Yousef voiced her "desire for Manbij [a city in the Governorate of Aleppo then occupied by ISIL forces] to be part of the democratic federal area [of Rojava] after its liberation." This was part of a wider campaign to unify the cantons of Rojava into a contiguous federation.

Early offensives

Throughout June 2016, roughly three months after Yousef became co-president, U.S.-backed Syrian Democratic Forces (SDF) carried out a campaign to liberate the territories still held by ISIL in northern Syria and to unify the cantons. On June 10, less than a week after liberated eight surrounding villages and the Manbij Military Council cut off ISIL's supply route between Manbij and the de facto ISIL capital of Raqqa, the SDF captured the city of Osajli Ten days later, the SDF captured Arima.

The liberation of Manbij

In July 2016, roughly one and a half months after the launch of the Manbij offensive by the SDF during which Osajli, Arima, and other cities were captures, ISIL suffered heavy losses in the west and north of the city of Manbij despite repeated attempts to break the SDF siege. As ISIL's expulsion from the city neared, Yousef announced that Manbij, a city of strategic importance, would soon join the Rojava federation via a popular referendum. The incorporation of Manbij would be a significant step toward uniting the currently non-contiguous Rojava federation cantons of Afrin and Kobani.

On Thursday July 21, 2016, the Syrian Democratic Forces gave ISIL forces a 48-hour ultimatum to leave Manbij. ISIL refused the ultimatum, and clashes broke out on Friday. By Monday the 25th, the Manbij Military Council (MMC), aligned with the SDF, had gained control of a majority of the city. By August 5, the MMC had captured roughly 80 percent of the city. On August 6, Syrian Democratic Forces declares that they had gained "almost complete control" of the city. Manbij was liberated on August 15, 2016.

The al-Bab offensive

Shortly after the liberation of Manbij, the "al-Bab Military Council" was created for the planned offensive to liberate the city of Al-Bab from the ISIL.

References

21st-century Syrian women politicians
21st-century Syrian politicians
Democratic Union Party (Syria) politicians
Living people
People of the Syrian civil war
Syrian Kurdish politicians
21st-century Kurdish women politicians
Year of birth missing (living people)